Jim Holloway (born 1954), an American, was one of the first of a new generation of boulderers for whom the sport was a lifestyle rather than a recreation. He began bouldering in the early 1970s in Boulder, Colorado, and in 1973 established his first notable route, Just Right (so named because it fit his very tall frame). In 1975 he put up Trice (aka: AHR - Another Holloway Route) – at today's grade of V11 or V12, exceptionally difficult for the 1970s.

John Sherman's V-System didn't come into existence for another fifteen years. In an effort to rate his routes Jim devised a personal variant on the old Gill B-System (which had only two or three levels of difficulty, depending upon one's interpretation of it). For Holloway, difficulty fell into three categories: JHE (Jim Holloway easy), JHM (Jim Holloway medium), and JHH (Jim Holloway hard).  

Holloway was one of the first boulderers to devote more than a few hours to creating a particular route. In the mid-1970s he began visiting Horsetooth Reservoir in Fort Collins, Colorado, where John Gill and his friend Rich Borgman had established a Dakota sandstone bouldering area.  Gill's problems there, having been fashioned in a matter of minutes or hours, were far easier than the standards Jim was setting, clearly demonstrating the change in bouldering philosophy that was taking place. As an example, Holloway worked on creating a line directly up Gill's Left Eliminator, which had been done from the side. Calling his project Meathook, he worked the problem for twenty days, during 1974 and 1975, before finally getting up. A challenging undercling on the fingertips was a key obstacle, and Jim used an artificial contrivance in his home – a simulator – to train for the move.  Fifteen years later Wolfgang Güllich would use his campus boards in a similar way to train for Action Directe. Meathook was perhaps V12 - for Jim, JHH - whereas most of the problems at Horsetooth were in the V3 to V7 range. 

In 1977, Holloway climbed Slapshot, on Dinosaur Mountain near Boulder. This challenge may very well be unrepeated as of 2006.

Jim's bouldering companions during the 1970s included Jim Michaels, Bob Williams & John Gill - from whom he learned dynamic techniques - Pat Ament, Chris Jones, and Scott Blunk. Holloway stopped bouldering about 1980, and became involved in bicycle racing. 

Thirty-two years after its first ascent, Trice was finally repeated. On the 15th of November 2007 Carlo Traversi and Jamie Emerson made the 2nd and 3rd ascents of 'Trice' giving it the grade of V12 (or B2+ on the Gill-scale). The problem was further climbed by James Pearson and Daniel Woods in December 2007, by Dave Graham in January 2008, by Seth Allred in February 2008, and by Giovanni Traversi in March 2008. In October 2008 after 4 days of effort Alex Puccio made the first female ascent (FFA) of Trice. She then repeated the problem twice for cameras, meaning she climbed Trice thrice.

References
 Ament, Pat (1980). "A Climber's Playground: A Guide to the Boulders of Flagstaff Mountain", March Press, Boulder
 Ament, Pat (2002). "Wizards of Rock : A History of Free Climbing in America", Wilderness Press
 Sherman, John (1994). "Stone Crusade: A Historical Guide to Bouldering in America", AAC Press

External links
Brief Profile
Alex Puccio Climbing Trice

1954 births
Living people
American rock climbers
Boulder climbers